KASE may refer to:

 KASE-FM, a radio station (100.7 FM) licensed to Austin, Texas, United States
 Aspen/Pitkin County Airport in Aspen, Colorado, United States
 Kazakhstan Stock Exchange, and its main stock market index
 Kase (surname), a Japanese surname
 Kaše, a Czech surname